The 2014 GT4 European Series season was the seventh season of the GT4 European Cup and the first with the new series denomination, the GT4 European Series. The season began on 10 May at Misano, and finished on 26 October at Monza after six race weekends.

In the main GT4 professional class, the championship title was won by two-time defending champion Ricardo van der Ende and team-mate Bernhard van Oranje for Racing Team Holland by Ekris Motorsport. Van der Ende and van Oranje won five races during the season, and ultimately won the title during the first race at Monza. The runner-up position, 22 points in arrears of van der Ende and van Oranje, was taken by 2013 amateur champion Jörg Viebahn. Viebahn won three races during the season; he won with Bertus Sanders at Misano and Paul Ricard, and partnered Simon Knap to victory at Monza. Although being outscored by Duncan Huisman and Luc Braams on total points, the series' best ten results regulation allowed Marcel Nooren and Jan Joris Verheul to take third in the championship, by a single point. Nooren and Verheul took successive victories at Spa-Francorchamps and Paul Ricard, while Huisman and Braams won at the Nürburgring. The only other entry to win a race was Alfab Racing, with drivers Erik Behrens and Daniel Roos, winning the first race at Monza after Huisman and Braams were given a post-race penalty.

The amateur GT4 class was poorly supported, with only three entries taking part at any point during the 2014 season. With seven victories, André Grammatico was the winner of the championship, and finished 15 points clear – on dropped scores – of Liesette Braams and Rob Severs, who won four races. The remaining race victory was taken by Fabian Lauda, who won at Zandvoort. In the teams' championship, Racing Team Holland by Ekris Motorsport claimed the title by 31 points, ahead of V8 Racing.

Calendar

Entry list

 Drivers competing in the Ginetta G50 class were ineligible for points.

Race calendar and results

References

External links

GT4 European Series
Gt4
GT4 European Series